John H. Smith may refer to:

John H. Smith (bishop) (1939–2012), sixth bishop of the Episcopal Diocese of West Virginia, 1989–1999
John H. Smith (mathematician), American mathematician
J. H. Smith (mayor) (1858–1956), mayor of Everett, Washington and co-founder of Anchorage, Alaska
John Henry Smith (1848–1911), leader of The Church of Jesus Christ of Latter-day Saints and a Utah politician
John Henry Smith (reporter), anchor and reporter for News 12 Long Island
John Henry Smith (politician) (1881–1953), Australian politician
John Hilary Smith (born 1928), British colonial governor and administrator in Nigeria and Oceania
John Hope Smith (died 1831), British colonial head of the Gold Coast colony
John Hugh Smith (1819–1870), three-time mayor of Nashville, Tennessee between 1845 and 1865
J. Hyatt Smith (1824–1886), clergyman and United States Representative from New York

See also
John Smith (disambiguation)